The Sydney International Piano Competition is a music competition, presented in Sydney and broadcast live throughout Australia and internationally. It is held every four years, over a three-week period in July–August, and is internationally recognised as one of the world's great piano competitions. The 12th competition was originally scheduled to take place in July 2020 but has since been postponed due to Covid19.

The competition was established in July 1977 by Claire Dan, with co-founders Rex Hobcroft and Robert Tobias, and was admitted as a member of the World Federation of International Music Competitions in 1978.

The Artistic Director from its inception until 2015 was Warren Thomson, who also served as chairman of the jury from 1992 until 2012. In April 2015, following Thomson's death in February, Piers Lane (a former competitor and juror) was announced as the Artistic Director of the 2016 competition.

For the first time in its history, the competition due to be held in July 2020 was postponed to 2021, due to the impact of the COVID-19 epidemic.

Structure
A total of 32 (originally 36) pianists are selected to participate in the competition. Worldwide auditions are held to select the entrants, who must be aged between 18 and 32. Traditionally, the previous winner presents a Gala Opening recital.

Rounds 
The competition consists of three stages – preliminaries, semi finals and finals. All 32 competitors appear in the preliminaries which consists of two rounds. Round 1 of the preliminaries is a 20 minute solo recital and round 2 is a 30 minute recital. Competitors must include an Australian work in one of these rounds. The organisers have collaborated with Australian Music Centre to compile a list of suggested works by Australian pianists. Miriam Hyde's Valley of Rocks was one of the pieces set for the 1988 competition; it was chosen by 23 of the contestants, and it went on to become her best-known work.

After the preliminary rounds, the best 12 are chosen to proceed to the Semi Finals which consists of two rounds - Semi Final Round 1 is a 65 minute recital and Semi Final Round 2 is a chamber work. In the 12th competition, this will be with either violin or cello. Six competitors advance to the finals, again consisting of two rounds, in which they play two piano concertos with the Sydney Symphony Orchestra. In the 12th competition, Finalists will play an unconducted concerto with Camarata Queensland in Finals Round 1 and a piano concerto with Sydney Symphony Orchestra in Finals Round 2.

Venues 
Until 2016, the first stages took place at the Seymour Centre, University of Sydney. In 2016 the venue was changed to Verbrugghen Hall, Sydney Conservatorium of Music. The final stage is held in the Concert Hall of the Sydney Opera House except in 2020 when the finals will be held at the Sydney Town Hall due to renovations at the Sydney Opera House.

Broadcast 
All stages are broadcast live on radio throughout Australia and to the world online, by ABC Classic FM. In 2020, ABC Classic considered the Sydney International Piano Competition one of its highlights of the year. In 2016, the competition was streamed live and free on the competition's website and social media channels.

In 2021, for the first time since the competitions inception in 1977, patrons were required to pay a subscription fee to watch and listen to the competition. The ABC for the first time did not broadcast the event on free-to-air television. Instead subscriptions which ranged from $20-$30 per session or an overall online subscription of $350 were charged by SIPCA.

Prizes 
The winner of the Sydney International Piano Competition receives a prize of $50,000 and a number of engagements including a national tour of Australia, international recital opportunities and a CD recording. Smaller prizes are awarded for other placings. In the competition's forty-year history, no Australian pianist has won first prize.

Musical patrons 
The list of musicians and others who have been involved with the competition as either patrons or jurors includes Vladimir Ashkenazy, Lazar Berman, Sir Bernard Heinze, Eileen Joyce, Eugene List, Sir Charles Mackerras, Denis Matthews, Hephzibah Menuhin, John O'Conor, Harold C. Schonberg, Sir Georg Solti and Gordon Watson.

2016 Competition 
The 11th Sydney International Piano Competition took place from the 6 to 23 July 2016. The preliminary rounds and semi final sounds were held in the Verbrugghen Hall at the Sydney Conservatorium of Music. The finals were held at the Sydney Opera House.

2016 Prize Winners

2016 Jury Members

2016 Special Prizewinners

Criticisms 
Despite its generally recognised prestige, the competition has been in the past strongly criticised by some established Australian pianists. The pianist and composer Larry Sitsky said: "The title Sydney International Piano Competition sounds grand and definitive. But behind the facade is a rather shabby private party in progress". The Liszt specialist and composer Leslie Howard said: "I was asked to be on the international advisory panel for this years ago ... and since then have never heard from any of them. ... No-one, of course, will ever hear from any of the prize-winners. They all seem to have had rather too close connections with members of the jury, which in any case is composed mostly of lacklustre teachers ... who have never been professional concert pianists in their lives and wouldn't recognise good and original artistry if it jumped up and bit them". Michael Kieran Harvey has asked: "What does the complete lack of success past SIPCA winners have had at making a career say about the cloth-eared selectors who travel around the world at great expense auditioning young hopefuls? Why, if SIPCA is such an internationally significant competition, are second-rate teachers no-one's ever heard of, to say nothing of completely unqualified non-musicians, sitting in judgment at this supposedly premier music event?" Despite his criticism, Harvey agreed to become the commentator for the ABC's radio broadcast of the 2000 competition, "in an attempt to provide some objective analysis".

Critics also pointed to the dominance of Warren Thomson, who single-handedly chose the repertoire and all the jurors, many of whom are associated with the Australian Institute of Music (AIM), of which he was Artistic Director, Professional Development Programs. With assistance from others, he also auditioned all the entrants and chose the 36 competitors. Alexei Yemtsov, a competitor at the 2000 competition, lived in Thomson's home and Thomson became his official guardian. That year, the minimum age was lowered from 18 to 17, although Thomson denied it had anything to do with Yemtsov's being only 17 at the time. The pianist Simon Tedeschi has said he "has no intention of ever collaborating with Thomson and SIPCA ... The school of pianism with which he associates himself is not to my taste ... The trained-seal mentality makes for poor musicianship, and, ultimately, unhappy lives". Margaret Hair, AIM's former head of keyboard studies, said: "There's a feeling among teachers that with Warren [Thomson] in charge, Australian students have little chance of making the final cut. The most tragic outcome of his effect on the piano scene in this country is a sense of hopelessness that most students now feel".

Critics also pointed to the fact that in some cases competitors are the students of members of the jury. For example, Mikhail Yanovitsky and Dmitry Grigortsevich, finalists in the 1996 competition, were students of Mikhail Voskresensky and Lev Vlassenko respectively, both of whom were jurors.

Prize winners and jurors

See also 

 List of classical music competitions

References

General
1977 Prize-Winners. The Sydney International Piano Competition of Australia. Retrieved on 2008-04-26
1981 Prize-Winners. The Sydney International Piano Competition of Australia. Retrieved on 2008-04-26
1985 Prize-Winners. The Sydney International Piano Competition of Australia. Retrieved on 2008-04-26
1988 Prize-Winners. The Sydney International Piano Competition of Australia. Retrieved on 2008-04-26.
1992 Prize-Winners. The Sydney International Piano Competition of Australia. Retrieved on 2008-04-26
1996 Prize-Winners. The Sydney International Piano Competition of Australia. Retrieved on 2008-04-26
2000 Prize-Winners. The Sydney International Piano Competition of Australia. Retrieved on 2008-04-26
. The Sydney International Piano Competition of Australia. Retrieved on 2008-04-26
2008 Prize-Winners . The Sydney International Piano Competition of Australia. Retrieved on 2016-07-27
2012 Prize-Winners . The Sydney International Piano Competition of Australia. Retrieved on 2016-07-27
2016 Prize-Winners . The Sydney International Piano Competition of Australia. Retrieved on 2016-07-27
Specific

External links

ABC Classic FM – Sydney International Piano Competition of Australia